Bogga is a genus of land planarians from South America. It is monotypic, being represented by the single species, Bogga bogotensis, which occurs in Bogotá, Colombia.

Description 
Bogga bogotensis has a large and broad, flat body. The copulatory apparatus lacks a permanent penis, but the male atrium is lined by multiple musculo-glandular papillae. The ovovitelline ducts enter the female atrium at the same time, without joining to form a common duct.

Etymology 
The name Bogga is a portmanteau of the specific epithet of the type species, bogotensis, and Amaga, another genus in the same subfamily in which the species was previously classified.

References 

Geoplanidae
Rhabditophora genera